Hjordkær is a village in Hjordkær parish, Aabenraa Municipality, Region of Southern Denmark in Denmark. It is located 9 km west of Aabenraa and 7 km south of Rødekro and has a population of 1,607 (1 January 2022).

References

Cities and towns in the Region of Southern Denmark
Aabenraa Municipality